The Harley-Davidson XG750R is a competition-only motorcycle made by Harley-Davidson for flat track racing. It is powered by the fuel-injected, liquid-cooled Revolution X V-twin engine from the 2015 Harley-Davidson Street 750.  It is the first all-new flat track racing motorcycle from Harley-Davidson in 44 years.

Competition

It was first used in competition by Davis Fisher of the Harley-Davidson Screamin' Eagle Factory Team on April 9, 2016 in the GNC1 race at the AMA Pro Flat Track Circuit of the Americas Half-Mile.  The motorcycle was built by Vance & Hines, long known in motorcycle racing for their road racing and drag racing success.

Differences between the XR750 and XG750

The XG has a number of changes from the older XR750, reflecting newer technology.

References

XG750R
Racing motorcycles
Motorcycles introduced in 2016